The Pernambuco worm snake (Amerotyphlops paucisquamus) is a species of snake in the Typhlopidae family.

References

paucisquamus
Reptiles described in 1979